Hans Erik Ingemar "Hasse" Svensson (born 30 July 1955) is a retired Swedish rower who won a bronze medal in the coxless fours at the 1983 World Rowing Championships. He competed at the 1976 and 1980 Summer Olympics in the single sculls and finished in ninth and fifth place, respectively. At the 1984 Games he joined the Swedish coxless fours team and finished sixth. After retiring from competitions he worked as a coach, particularly with Martin Feuk. His father Ingemar rowed at the 1952 Games.

References

1955 births
Living people
People from Falkenberg
Swedish male rowers
Olympic rowers of Sweden
Rowers at the 1976 Summer Olympics
Rowers at the 1980 Summer Olympics
Rowers at the 1984 Summer Olympics
World Rowing Championships medalists for Sweden
Sportspeople from Halland County